Decreed By Fate (Chinese: 千金难逃), is a 2022 Chinese comedy romance costume series, starring Li Jiu Lin, Chen Fang Tong, and Wu Cheng Xu. The full series was released on 31 March 2022 on IQIYI and is also available on iQiyi app and iQ.com.

Synopsis 
Ye Rong Er, the "female Zhang Fei" of Lianwang County, who no one dared to bother, married Yin Sishen, the marquis of Jing'an, who she has never met before. In order to solve her divorce lawsuit, Ye Rong Er decided to become a first-class matchmaker, thus setting up Boqing Inn, to break up marriages and solve cases every day. At the same time, Ye Rong Er discovered that the two first-level matchmaker who joined Boqing Inn approached her with ulterior motives. What surprised her even more was that her "husband" Yin Sishen, who had escaped the marriage, seemed to be hiding between the two.

Cast

Main 

 Li Jiu Lin as Lu Ting Xiao/Yin Sishen
 Chen Fang Tong as Ye Rong Er/ "Zhang Fei"
 Wu Cheng Xu as Fang Xian Xun

Supporting 

 Salmon Xu as Wang Yi Zhi
 Xu Ning as Zheng Lin
 Chen Yu Feng as Liu Zhan
 Wu Hao as Zhang Jiu
 Wang Hong Qian as Yue Li Weng
 Jiang Rui Ze as Qin Yi Yi
 Hu Dong Qing as Lu Ru Yi
 Tian Feng as Hong Yuan Shan

Production 
The series began filming on 27 May 2021 in Hengdian, China.

References

External links 
 https://movie.douban.com/subject/35816955/

2022 Chinese television series debuts